James Downing may refer to:

 James W. Downing (1913–2018), American naval officer
 James R. Downing, American pathologist and executive at St. Jude Children's Research Hospital
 Jim Downing (born 1942), American racing driver, owner, and developer
 Jim Downing (Gaelic footballer) (1946–2012), Irish Gaelic footballer